Vincent Cheng Hoi-Chuen GBS OBE JP (16 July 1948 – 28 August 2022) was a Hong Kong banker who was  HSBC Holdings plc. He was also chairman of The Hongkong and Shanghai Banking Corporation Limited, the Asia-Pacific branch of HSBC and founding member of the group, from 2005 to 2010.

Early years and education
Cheng grew up in a poor family of six, despite difficult circumstances and having been crippled by polio at a young age. He was educated in Hong Kong and in New Zealand, receiving his Bachelor of Social Science in Economics from the Chinese University of Hong Kong (CUHK) and a Master of Philosophy in Economics from the University of Auckland.

Career
Cheng joined The Hongkong and Shanghai Banking Corporation in 1978, when he worked in the Group Finance department. In 1982 he moved to the Bank's Group Planning department, before he was appointed Chief Economist in 1986. From April 1989 to April 1991, he was seconded to the Hong Kong Government's Central Policy Unit and acted as an adviser to the Governor of Hong Kong. He took up the post of general manager in June 1995 and then the first ethnic Chinese Executive Director of the Bank in November that same year.

He was appointed vice-chairman and Chief Executive of Hang Seng Bank, a bank which The Hongkong and Shanghai Banking Corporation holds majority stake, in 1998. On 25 May 2005, he became Chairman of The Hongkong and Shanghai Banking Corporation, taking over from David Eldon. He also became the managing director of HSBC Group and the Director of HSBC Bank Australia Limited. On 1 April 2007, he became Chairman of the HSBC Bank (China) Company Limited. He has also been appointed the first ethnic Chinese Executive Director of HSBC Holdings on 1 February 2008.

In January 2008, he was appointed a member of the National Committee of the 11th Chinese People's Political Consultative Conference (CPPCC), and a senior advisor to the 11th Beijing Municipal Committee of the CPPCC.

His previous government advisory roles have included Member of the Executive Council from 1995 to 1997 and a Hong Kong Affairs Adviser to the People's Republic of China from 1994 to 1997. 

He was also a Member of the Legislative Council of Hong Kong from 1991 to 1995.

His public service duties included serving as Chairman of the Standing Committee on Directorate Salaries and Conditions of Service for the Government of the Hong Kong Special Administrative Region and Member of the Exchange Fund Advisory Committee of the Hong Kong Monetary Authority. He was also Honorary President of the Hong Kong Society for Rehabilitation.

Cheng had been appointed the Justice of the Peace, Officer of the Most Excellent Order of the British Empire (OBE) (1994), and Gold Bauhinia Star (GBS) (2005).

Death 
Cheng died on the night of 28 August 2022, aged 74.

References

1948 births
2022 deaths
Hong Kong bankers
Hong Kong chief executives
Alumni of the Chinese University of Hong Kong
University of Auckland alumni
HSBC people
Hang Seng Bank
Officers of the Order of the British Empire
Hong Kong financial businesspeople
Members of the Executive Council of Hong Kong
HK LegCo Members 1991–1995
Members of the 11th Chinese People's Political Consultative Conference
Members of the Selection Committee of Hong Kong
District councillors of Yuen Long District
Honorary Fellows of the London School of Economics
Recipients of the Gold Bauhinia Star